Thomas John Ellis (born 17 November 1978) is a Welsh actor. He is known for playing Lucifer Morningstar in the Fox urban fantasy series Lucifer and its Crisis on Infinite Earths crossover appearance in the Arrowverse franchise, Gary Preston in the BBC One sitcom Miranda, Hollywood doctor William P. Rush in the USA Network series Rush, and Mark Etches in the supernatural drama series The Fades.

Early life
Thomas John Ellis was born in Cardiff on 17 November 1978, the son of Marilyn Jean (née Hooper) and Christopher John Ellis. He has three sisters, one of whom is his twin. His father, uncle, and one of his sisters are all Baptist ministers. After his birth, the family moved to England and he grew up in Sheffield, South Yorkshire. He attended Sheffield's High Storrs School and played the French horn in the City of Sheffield Youth Orchestra. He later earned a BA in Dramatic Studies at the Royal Scottish Academy of Music and Drama in Glasgow.

Career
Ellis' breakout role was that of Gary Preston on the BBC One sitcom Miranda (2010–2015); he has also appeared as King Cenred on the BBC fantasy series Merlin (2008); Justyn in Channel 4's No Angels; and Thomas Milligan in the Doctor Who series three finale "Last of the Time Lords". He has appeared in the long-running BBC One soap opera EastEnders; the BBC sketch comedy show The Catherine Tate Show; and the BBC medical drama Holby City. In July and August 2009, he starred in the ITV comedy drama Monday Monday. He was cast as Detective Inspector Bland in Agatha Christie's Poirot.

In February 2015, Ellis was cast as Lucifer Morningstar in the Fox series Lucifer, based on DC Comics' publication and character of the same name, which premiered on 25 January 2016. The show later moved to Netflix. On 23 June 2020, it was announced that Netflix had renewed the show for a sixth and final season. He reprised the role of Lucifer during The CW's The Flash episode of the Arrowverse crossover "Crisis on Infinite Earths".

In 2021, Ellis won the Tell-Tale TV Award for Favorite Actor in a Cable or Streaming Sci-fi/Fantasy/Horror Series.

Personal life
In 2006, Ellis married actress Tamzin Outhwaite, with whom he has two children. They divorced in April 2014. He has a third child from a previous relationship. He married American screenwriter Meaghan Oppenheimer in 2019.

Filmography

Film

Television

References

External links
 

1978 births
Living people
20th-century Welsh male actors
21st-century Welsh male actors
Alumni of the Royal Conservatoire of Scotland
Male actors from Cardiff
People educated at High Storrs School
Welsh expatriates in Canada
Welsh male film actors
Welsh male soap opera actors
Welsh male television actors